Presidential elections were held in the Republic of Abkhazia on 22 March 2020 following the decision of the Supreme Court to annul the results of the 2019 election on 10 January, and the subsequent resignation of President Raul Khajimba due to protests against his presidency.

Aslan Bzhania was considered the frontrunner in the elections, and was elected with around 59% of the vote.

Candidates

Results

Aftermath
After the elections results were announced, Bzhania gave a press conference. He announced planned constitutional reforms and that Alexander Ankvab would be the next prime minister.

References

 
presidential
Presidential elections in Abkhazia